Rewari Khera is a village in the Bhiwani district of the Indian state of Haryana. , the village had 922 households with a population of 4,924 of which 2,588 were male and 2,336 female.

References

Villages in Bhiwani district